Mount Silliman is a mountain in California along the boundary between Sequoia National Park and Kings Canyon National Park The summit, at  is on the Sillman Crest, a part of the Kings-Kaweah Divide.

History
The peak was named by members of the Whitney Survey in honor of Benjamin Silliman, professor of chemistry at Yale College. William Brewer, the head of the survey, had studied agricultural chemistry under Silliman. Besides the mountain and crest, there are a pass, a creek, a meadow and a lake that bear the name Silliman.

The first recorded ascent was by Clarence King, James Gardiner, Richard Cotter, and William Brewer on June 28, 1864.

Climb

The summit can be approached by way of the Twin Lakes trail from the Lodgepole Campground on the Generals Highway. From Sillman Pass traverse to the east ridge and follow it to the summit. There are several more technical routes to the summit which are mostly  or more difficult.

Flora
The rare foxtail pine grows directly below Silliman's summit.

See also

 Silliman Pass, directly below
 Twin Peaks, quite near

References

Mountains of Sequoia National Park
Mountains of Tulare County, California
Mountains of Northern California